Enrique Palacios Hernández is a Spanish politician who served as the second Mayor-President of Melilla, a Spanish enclave on the north coast of Africa, from 3 March 1998 until 5 July 1999.

References

1952 births
Living people
Mayor-Presidents of Melilla
Members of the Assembly of Melilla